The 2012–13 season was the Manitoba Junior Hockey League's (MJHL) 96th season of operation.

Season highlights
The Winnipeg Saints are sold to a group from Virden in April 2012 and relocate to the southwestern Manitoba community.  The team is renamed the Virden Oil Capitals and moves to the Sherwood Division.  The Winnipeg Blues are now the sole team based in Winnipeg.
The Steinbach Pistons are purchased by a group of local investors and become a community-owned organization.
The league shortens its regular season schedule from 341 games to 330.  Each team plays two less games as a result.
The league holds its annual showcase event October 4–6 at the MTS Iceplex.
The Steinbach Pistons join the MJHL playoffs for the first time in ten years, defeat the two-time defending champion Portage Terriers, and then upset the league's top two teams from the regular season, the Winnipeg Blues and Dauphin Kings, to win their organization's first ever Turnbull Cup. 
The Pistons qualify for the newly-created Western Canada Cup, but do not advance past the round robin.

Standings

Playoffs

Post MJHL playoffs
Western Canada Cup
First year of the new format involving the four western leagues of the CJHL.
Steinbach Pistons finish fifth in the round robin and are eliminated from playoffs.

League awards 
 Steve "Boomer" Hawrysh Award (MVP): Guillaume Naud, Dauphin
 MJHL Top Goaltender Award: Adam Iwan, Portage
 Brian Kozak Award (Top Defenceman): Tanner Butler, Dauphin
 Vince Leah Trophy (Rookie of the Year): Tristan Keck, Winkler
 Lorne Lyndon Memorial Trophy (Hockey Ability and Sportsmanship): Connor Cleverly, Winnipeg
 Muzz McPherson Award (Coach of the Year): Don MacGillivray, Winnipeg
 Mike Ridley Trophy (Scoring Champion): Jesse Sinatynski, Dauphin
 MJHL Playoff MVP: Corey Koop, Steinbach

CJHL awards
 CJHL Player of the Year (MJHL): Guillaume Naud, Dauphin
 CJHL Rookie of the Year: Tristan Keck, Winkler

References

External links
 MJHL Website
 2012-13 MJHL season at HockeyDB.com

Manitoba Junior Hockey League seasons
MJHL